Ralph DeQuebec (born March 24, 1983) is an American ice sled hockey player. DeQuebec made his Winter Paralympics debut during the 2018 Winter Paralympics; winning gold in the mixed tournament.

Biography
DeQuebec served in the United States Marine Corps as an aviation ordnance technician and in explosive ordnance disposal technician. He served during the Iraq War and in Helmand Province, losing both of his legs above the knee and having a partial amputation of his little finger and right thumb from a bomb explosion during the War in Afghanistan.

References

External links

1983 births
Living people
American sledge hockey players
Para ice hockey players at the 2018 Winter Paralympics
Para ice hockey players at the 2022 Winter Paralympics
Paralympic sledge hockey players of the United States
Paralympic gold medalists for the United States
Medalists at the 2018 Winter Paralympics
Medalists at the 2022 Winter Paralympics
Paralympic medalists in sledge hockey
United States Marines
United States Marine Corps personnel of the Iraq War
United States Marine Corps personnel of the War in Afghanistan (2001–2021)